LaVerle Pratt (born June 22, 1943) is a former linebacker who played in the Canadian Football League (CFL).

After playing college football at University of Idaho, Pratt was chosen by the St.Louis Cardinals in the 1966 NFL Draft.

Pratt first played professional football in the Canadian Football League with the Grey Cup champion Ottawa Rough Riders. He suited up for 4 games and returned 1 kickoff for 5 yards. After a season in the Continental Football League (COFL) with the Spokane Shockers, he was picked up by the Winnipeg Blue Bombers in 1970, where he played 5 games.

After his football career he taught at Kennewick High School, in Kennewick, Washington and now resides in Elk City, Idaho.

References

Living people
Ottawa Rough Riders players
Winnipeg Blue Bombers players
Idaho Vandals football players
Continental Football League players
1943 births